Eiras is a former civil parish in the municipality of Coimbra, Portugal. The population in 2011 was 12,097, in an area of 9.02 km2. On 28 January 2013 it merged with São Paulo de Frades to form Eiras e São Paulo de Frades.

References 

Former parishes of Coimbra